National Highway 561, commonly referred to as NH 561 is a national highway in  India. It is a spur road of National Highway 61. NH-561 traverses the state of Maharashtra in India.

Route 

Ahmednagar, Chinchodi-Patil, Kada, Ashti, Jamkhed, Sautadaa, Patoda fhata, Therla, Pitthi, Shirapur, Beed.

Junctions  
 
  Terminal near Ahmednagar.
  near Jamkhed.
  Terminal near Beed.

See also 

 List of National Highways in India
 List of National Highways in India by state

References

External links 

 NH 561 on OpenStreetMap

National highways in India
National Highways in Maharashtra